The following tables are comparisons of the specifications of Microsoft Lumia smartphones from within the same generation. Lumia devices were developed and sold by Nokia until the acquisition of its mobile phone division by Microsoft in early 2014. The Nokia brand continued to be used on new models until the release of the Microsoft Lumia 535 in November 2014.

First generation (Windows Phone 7)

Second generation (Windows Phone 8)

Third generation (Windows Phone 8.1)

Fourth generation (Windows Phone 8.1 Update 2)

Fifth generation (Windows 10 Mobile)

See also 
 Comparison of Google Nexus smartphones
 Comparison of iPhone model
 Comparison of Samsung Galaxy S smartphones
 History of mobile phones

References

External links 
 

Windows Phone devices
Microsoft Lumia

Videotelephony
Products introduced in 2011
Lumia
Computing comparisons